"Body" is a song by American rapper and singer Dreezy, released on January 23, 2016 as the lead single from her debut studio album No Hard Feelings (2016). The song features American singer Jeremih and was produced by BloodPop.

Composition
The song contains a mixture of hip hop and R&B elements, with metaphors of violence while sex is being described in the lyrics; Dreezy uses the idiom "catch a body", a slang phrase meaning to murder, but instead referring to finding company and attraction. Jeremih also adds a few analogies of guns.

Music video
A music video for the song was released on May 13, 2016, via MTV Jams. Directed by Erik White, the video shows Dreezy and Jeremih at a house party, before they drive off together.

Charts

Weekly charts

Year-end charts

Certifications

References

2016 singles
2016 songs
Jeremih songs
Interscope Records singles
Songs written by BloodPop
Songs written by Jeremih
Songs written by Starrah